Monte Mammicomito is a massif in the Serre Calabresi, southern Calabria, southern Italy. It is composed of Devonian-origin limestone.

Monte Mammicomito is separated from Monte Consolino by a narrow valley, in which is the town of Pazzano.

Sources

Mountains of Calabria
Mountains of the Apennines
One-thousanders of Italy